Rożnowo Nowogardzkie  is a village in the administrative district of Gmina Maszewo, within Goleniów County, West Pomeranian Voivodeship, in north-western Poland.

References

Villages in Goleniów County